David Stevenson was a Scottish professional footballer who played in the Scottish League for Cowdenbeath, Hibernian, Bo'ness, Leith Athletic and Dunfermline Athletic as a goalkeeper.

Personal life 
Stevenson enlisted in the British Army during the First World War.

Career statistics

References

Year of birth missing
Scottish footballers
Scottish Football League players
Association football goalkeepers
Hibernian F.C. players
Year of death missing
British Army personnel of World War I
Place of death missing

Leith Athletic F.C. players
Lochgelly United F.C. players
St Bernard's F.C. players
Bo'ness F.C. players
Cowdenbeath F.C. players
Dunfermline Athletic F.C. players
Footballers from Edinburgh